Dzheyrakh-Assa Museum-Reserve is a Vainakh cultural and historical landscape in Ingushetia, consisting of a number of reserves and auls. In the territory of 64 thousand hectares there are about five hundred stone architectural complexes : funerary crypts, Pagan and Christian shrines and temples, and Vainakh towers. The first towers date back to the 20 century BC.

There are about 2,000 inhabitants in Dzheyrakhsky district of Ingushetia.

Noteworthy places of Assa-Jeyrakh:

 'Erzi' (Боевые башни Эрзи) is a state nature reserve, includes one of the largest tower complexes of Ingushetia.
 Tower complex Vovnushki (Башенный комплекс Вовнушки) is a late medieval complex of defensive Ingush towers. In 2008 Vovnushki became the finalist of the project Seven Wonders of Russia.
 Tower complex Targim (Башенный комплекс "Таргим") is an aul in Dzheyrakhsky district of Ingushetia, is located in the Targum hollow, on the right bank of the river Assa. In the village, battle towers were preserved.
 'Thaba-Erds'  (Тхаба-ерды) is an ancient Christian temple in Dzheyrakhsky district of Ingushetia, between the aul of Khairah and Pui of Assin gorge, not far from the border with Georgia.
 Tower complex 'Egikal' (Башенный комплекс Эгикхал) is an aul in the Dzheyrakhsky district of Ingushetia. On its territory, there is an architectural complex "Egikal", represented by many historical objects. And one of the military towers with a height of 27 meters was preserved in almost perfect condition.

Since 1996 Dzheyrakh-Assa Museum-Reserve has been a candidate for the list of World Heritage UNESCO

References 

Ingushetia
Cultural heritage monuments in Ingushetia
Objects of cultural heritage of Russia of federal significance